Arnaud Pierre Dony (born 8 May 2004) is a Belgian professional footballer who plays as a centre-back for Union SG and the Belgium national under-18 team.

Club career
After playing youth football for Wanze Bas-Oha, Dony joined Sint-Truiden's youth team in 2019. He made his debut for Sint-Truiden on 20 February 2022 against OH Leuven.

On 9 June 2022, Dony signed a contract with Union SG for the term of three years, with an option to extend for additional two.

International career
Dony made 2 appearances for the Belgium under-16 team in 2020 and 6 appearances for the Belgium under-18 team in 2021.

References

External links

2004 births
Living people
Belgian footballers
Association football defenders
Sint-Truidense V.V. players
Royale Union Saint-Gilloise players
Belgian Pro League players
Belgium youth international footballers